Belaya Glina is the name of several rural localities in Russia:
Belaya Glina, Krasnodar Krai, a selo in Beloglinsky Rural Okrug of Beloglinsky District of Krasnodar Krai
Belaya Glina, Sverdlovsk Oblast, a village in Verkhotursky District of Sverdlovsk Oblast